Haiyan County is a county of Qinghai Province, China, located on the northeast shore of Qinghai Lake. It is under the administration of Haibei Tibetan Autonomous Prefecture.  It is home to 原子城 (Atomic Bomb city) covering 570 km²

Climate

Economy
A major nuclear research facility, Plant 221, was established in 1958 at the location called Jinyintan in Haiyan County.

See also
 List of administrative divisions of Qinghai

References

County-level divisions of Qinghai
Haibei Tibetan Autonomous Prefecture